Oviñana is one of three parishes (administrative divisions) in Sobrescobio, a municipality within the province and autonomous community of Asturias, in northern Spain.  

The postal code is 33993.

Villages
 Anzó
 Campiellos 
 Comillera
 La Polina -
 Rioseco (Rusecu) 
 Villamorey (Villmoré)

Parishes in Sobrescobio